No. 160 Squadron RAF was a Royal Air Force unit during the Second World War, when it flew for four years in a number of roles including heavy bomber, minelaying, reconnaissance, special operations and transport unit in the Middle East and South-East Asian theatre of World War II.

History

First World War: False start
No. 160 Squadron was originally proposed on 9 May 1918 as a bomber squadron for deployment to France with DH.9As on 7 October, shortly afterwards amended to 20 October, but formation had not yet taken place when these plans were cancelled on 4 July. The formation was then rescheduled to take place on 20 September at Bristol (Filton) for deployment to France on 20 November, but this plan in its turn was suspended on 29 July and cancelled altogether on 17 August. The squadron thus never effectively formed during the First World War.

Second World War

To India via Palestine
No. 160 Squadron RAF was formed at RAF Thurleigh, Bedfordshire on 16 January 1942 as a heavy bomber/reconnaissance unit equipped with Consolidated Liberator aircraft. The squadron was posted to India on 12 February 1942, but without its aircraft and crews, who remained in England for training at RAF Polebrook, Northamptonshire. In June 1942 the crews and aircraft moved to the Middle East for bomber operations alongside No. 159 squadron. Whilst being based in Egypt and Palestine the squadron flew missions against targets in Libya and Crete. From November 1942 the squadron's crew and aircraft gradually moved to India, this being completed early February 1943, first mission was flown on 6 February over the Bay of Bengal. The squadron moved to Ceylon on 19 February, being based first at Ratmalana and later at Sigiriya, Kankesanturai and Minneriya. At first the squadron was involved in reconnaissance missions and minelaying and later became involved in dropping supplies to units operating behind enemy lines. When the war ended 160 squadron returned to Kankesanturai and served for a while in the transport role.

Back in the UK
On 23 June 1946, the return to the UK of the squadron was completed, and they were based at RAF Leuchars, Fife, Scotland, operating as a reconnaissance squadron.
The squadron converted to Avro Lancaster GR.3s in August 1946, but was disbanded shortly after on 30 September 1946, being renumbered to No.120 squadron.

Aircraft operated

Squadron bases

Commanding officers

References

Citations

Bibliography

External links
 Burma Star Association: 160 Squadron RAF 
 Squadron histories for nos. 156–160 sqn on Air of Authority – A History of RAF Organisation 
 No. 160 Squadron history
 Graves of 160 Sqdn Liberator crew (Cox, Durrant, Ellerker, Harwood, Lawrence, Reilly) killed over Crete, 28 Oct 1942

160 Squadron
Military units and formations established in 1942
Military units and formations disestablished in 1946
Aircraft squadrons of the Royal Air Force in World War II
Military history of Sri Lanka
Military units and formations of Ceylon in World War II
Military units and formations in Mandatory Palestine in World War II